Herzogenaurach is a town in the district of Erlangen-Höchstadt, in Bavaria, Germany. It is best known for being the home of the major international sporting goods companies Adidas and Puma, as well as the large car parts manufacturer Schaeffler Group.

Geography
The town is located on the Aurach river, a tributary of the Regnitz river.

History
Herzogenaurach was first mentioned in a document from 1002 under the name of Uraha when Holy Roman Emperor Henry II granted the town to the Prince-Bishopric of Bamberg.

Economy
Herzogenaurach has gained global fame as the birthplace of two giant sporting goods companies: Adidas and Puma, each founded respectively by brothers Adolf Dassler and Rudolf Dassler, after an acrimonious familial split in 1948. Operating since the 1960s, both companies' headquarters are still located in the town, originally on opposite sides of the Aurach River, and brand loyalty was sharply divided as well. For many years, Adidas and Puma workers would not associate with each other, and even when Adolf and Rudi died, they were buried in opposite ends of the town's cemetery. These differences have cleared up over the years.

Also the headquarters of Schaeffler Group are located in Herzogenaurach.

Sport
Even the town's two football clubs were divided by the Adidas/Puma split: ASV Herzogenaurach was supported by Adidas, while FC Herzogenaurach endorsed Puma's footwear. Both clubs still play at amateur level.

The Argentina national football team were based in Herzogenaurach for the 2006 FIFA World Cup.

Néstor De la Torre, Mexico's Director of National Teams, said the Mexico national football team would gather for 12 days in the city, its last stop before heading to South Africa for the 2010 World Cup.

Herzo Base

Herzogenaurach was the location of a military airfield beginning in the 1930s. Initially, the post was limited in its use as a Hitler youth training school due to limitations imposed by the Versailles Treaty after World War I.

However, fighter pilots soon began training in civilian clothing. In March 1936, the Luftwaffe took official control. The airfield was mainly used as a fuelling point for aircraft providing air cover for troops during the invasion of Austria and Czechoslovakia.

During the Western Allied invasion of Germany in April 1945, the United States Third Army seized the airfield. It was designated as ALG R-29. It was first occupied by a transportation unit followed by the USAAF 354th Fighter Group in May. In May 1946, the 2nd Radio Corps took over the installation and renamed it "Herzo Base". In 1947 the base was occupied by the U.S. Army Security Agency up until 1971, when it was replaced by the 210th Field Artillery Group (re-designated as the 210th Field Artillery Brigade on 16 September 1980) which occupied Herzo Base until 1992. Herzo Base was included in the base closure plan. On 4 August 1992, the installation was officially returned to the German Government. It has since served as a civilian recreational airfield, with ICAO code EDQH.

International relations

Herzogenaurach is twinned with:
 Wolfsberg, Austria, since 1968
 Kaya, Burkina Faso, since 1972
 Nova Gradiška, Croatia, since 1980
 Sainte-Luce-sur-Loire, France, since 1988
 Peacehaven, United Kingdom, since 2007

References

External links

Official site 
BBC News article on the town
Wikivoyage

 
Erlangen-Höchstadt